The Maughold Head Mine was a copper mine located in the parish of Maughold, Isle of Man.<ref name="ReferenceA">'Manx Sun. Saturday, March 29, 1873; Page: 16</ref>

History
Mining was a thriving industry on the Isle of Man up until the early part of the 20th century. The sett of the Maughold Mine comprised 95 acres and consisted of three lodes with strong branches or feeders between them.
The lodes ran in the same direction as the Great Laxey lodes and adjoined that of the Dhyrnane Mine.

The mines however produced a poor yield which resulted in the Maughold Head Mining Company, the mine's operator going into liquidation in 1874.

See also
 Snaefell Wheel
 Laxey Wheel
 Great Laxey Mine
 Great Laxey Mine Railway
 Great Snaefell Mine
 Foxdale Mines

References

SourcesBibliography'''

 The Forgotten Iron Mines of Kirk Maughold, Isle of Man - D.B. Hollis, 1988. Published by The Northern Mine Research Society (1988).

Underground mines in the Isle of Man
1866 establishments in the Isle of Man